Denis Fillion (June 26, 1948 – February 27, 2016) was a Canadian curler from Winnipeg, Manitoba.

Awards
Manitoba Sports Hall of Fame: inducted in 2002 with all of 1995 Kerry Burtnyk team, Canadian and World champions

Personal life
Fillion grew up in Elie, Manitoba. His family moved to Gilbert Plains, Manitoba in 1967. He was married to Trudy Murray-Thomson, and lived in Winnipeg with her and their two children. He worked for Harvey's and as a car salesman. Fillion also played hockey, and was the goaltender for the Dauphin Kings of the Manitoba Junior Hockey League in 1967. He was also an avid golfer and coached his son's provincial champion baseball team.

Teams

References

External links
 
Denis Fillion – Curling Canada Stats Archive
Video: 
FILLION DENIS - Winnipeg Free Press Passages

1948 births
2016 deaths
Curlers from Winnipeg
Canadian male curlers
World curling champions
Brier champions
People from Central Plains Region, Manitoba
People from Parkland Region, Manitoba
20th-century Canadian people